Greece competed at the 2019 World Championships in Athletics in Doha, Qatar, from 27 September to 6 October 2019. A team of 21 athletes, 7 men and 9 women, represented the country in a total of 13 events.

Medalists

Results

Men
Track and road events

Field events

Women 
Track and road events

Field events

Sources 
Official website
Official IAAF competition website
Greek team 

Nations at the 2019 World Athletics Championships
World Championships in Athletics
Greece at the World Championships in Athletics